Alpena is an unincorporated community in Randolph County, West Virginia, United States.

Alpena as a name is a corruption of Alpine, a large share of the first settlers being natives of Switzerland.

Climate
According to the Köppen Climate Classification system, Alpena has a humid continental climate, abbreviated "Dfb" on climate maps.

References 

Unincorporated communities in West Virginia
Unincorporated communities in Randolph County, West Virginia